Daihiniella is a genus of sand-treader crickets in the family Rhaphidophoridae. There is one described species in Daihiniella, D. bellicosa.

References

Further reading

 

Rhaphidophoridae
Articles created by Qbugbot